Storey's African mole-rat (Tachyoryctes storeyi) is a species of rodent in the family Spalacidae endemic to Kenya.  Its natural habitat is subtropical or tropical dry lowland grassland.

Some taxonomic authorities consider it to be conspecific with the East African mole-rat.

References

Mammals of Kenya
Tachyoryctes
Endemic fauna of Kenya
Mammals described in 1909
Taxa named by Oldfield Thomas
Taxonomy articles created by Polbot
Taxobox binomials not recognized by IUCN